Queensland Raceway nicknamed "the paperclip" is a motor racing circuit located at Willowbank in Ipswich, Queensland, Australia.  The circuit did host Supercars Championship until 2019, drifting as well as club level racing and ride days.

There are six corners. The circuit was designed by Tony Slattery with input from car and motorcycle racing authorities including CAMS circuit expert Professor Rod Troutbeck.

Queensland Raceway is a FIA Grade 3 circuit. However, the track uses a mixture of sanctioning bodies including Motorsport Australia, AASA and Motorcycling Australia for its events including race meetings, drifting, motorbike ride days and roll racing.

Spectator viewing at the facility is excellent with the flat layout of the circuit and spectator mounds. However the flat layout makes racing less exciting for the competitors than undulating circuits like Phillip Island. The track became infamous for its bumps, although it was resurfaced in late 2011.

Queensland Raceway is located with the bounds of the Ipswich Motorsport Precinct, which is also home to the Willowbank Raceway dragstrip, a kart track, a short dirt circuit and a junior (under-16) motorcycle speedway. The track is also located near RAAF Base Amberley and shares the base's  noise exclusion zone.

Configurations 
There are three Short Circuit variations of the track in addition to the full circuit:
 Sportsman 
 Clubman 
 Sprint 

The National circuit gets the most use for testing purposes and for major motorsport events. The Clubman circuit is also utilised regularly at state and club level racing. The Sprint circuit also in semi-regular use. The Sportsman circuit, originally optimised for truck racing, is now rarely used.

Dick Johnson Straight

Dick Johnson was honoured on 16 August 2001, when the front straight of the Queensland Raceway was officially named "Dick Johnson Straight".

Johnson, a five-time national champion and three-time Bathurst winner, proudly unveiled a piece of pit-lane wall, which now bears his name and a plaque commemorating the ceremony and Johnson's motor racing achievements. The unveiling was part of the pre-race build-up to the 2001 VIP Petfoods Queensland 500. Johnson was joined by his son Steve during the ceremony as well as a host of V8 Supercar drivers and teams during what was a serious day of testing at the circuit.

Johnson was one of the driving forces behind the development of the Queensland Raceway and made his last competitive drive in a V8 Supercar in 2000's Queensland 500 with son Steve.

Lap records
As of August 2022, the official race lap records at Queensland Raceway are listed as:

Future development

A huge accident on 1 May 2010 in a Mini Challenge support race to the 2010 V8 Supercar Championship Series sparked discussion about the safety of the circuit. However, circuit owner at the time, John Tetley insisted that the track was still safe. TeamVodafone driver Craig Lowndes suggested that Queensland Raceway was long overdue for upgrades including a resurfacing. Tetley stated that resurfacing would be done in late 2010, although major flooding in the south-east Queensland region early in 2011, and the subsequent lack of availability of necessary equipment as devastated roads are repaired has seen that resurfacing delayed for twelve months. In October 2011 the resurfacing was commenced and completed before Christmas.

During July 2016, the Ipswich council announced plans to invest $220 million upgrading Queensland Raceway. The first phase of the project is to extend the length of current circuit. The proposed plans by the council were never followed through with after massive upheaval and controversy. The company responsible (Ipswich Motorsport Park PTY LTD) for the redevelopment was wound up in 2017 and de-registered.

In October 2021 former owner John Tetley and Tony Quinn signed a pact under which the Quinn took  the lease, management and operations of Queensland Raceway. Since this time the circuit has seen a big investment to lift its standards and facilities to where they should have been.

Willowbank 300 
The Willowbank 300 is held annually at Queensland Raceway as part of the Queensland Endurance Championship. 

The Endurance Championship consists of the Ipswich event and the Lakeside Park 300 which is traditionally held in the latter part of the year at the historic circuit north of Brisbane. The Willowbank 300 has been a landmark event on the Queensland Raceway calendar since 2014.

Fatalities at the circuit 
There have been four fatalities at the venue since it opened in 1999. Porsche Supercup driver Sean Edwards in 2013 during testing, as well as club-racer Dennis Smith at a sprint event in 2016.  Two further deaths occurred when a 32-year-old driver and 41-year-old passenger were killed in August 2017.

Notes

References

External links
Queensland Raceway
Circuit map and history at RacingCircuits.info
Ride / Race your motorbike at QLD raceway

Motorsport venues in Queensland
Supercars Championship circuits
Sport in Ipswich, Queensland